The  or , is a  high variable-radius arch dam on the Kurobe River in Toyama Prefecture, Japan. The tallest dam in Japan, it supports the 335 MW Kurobe No. 4 Hydropower Plant and is owned by Kansai Electric Power Company. It was constructed between 1956 and 1963 at a cost of ¥51.3 billion yen. The project was a difficult engineering feat for the rapidly growing post–World War II Japan, and claimed the lives of 171 people.

History

In 1951, the Kansai Electric Power Company was formed to provide electric power for the Kansai region of Japan. Shortly after their formation, the area suffered from drought which caused power rationing. The drought, along with the rapid growth of post–World War II Japan, pushed the company to increase their generating capacity. After a series of geological and hydrological studies of the Kurobe River and Gorge, it was announced in late 1955 that the Kurobe Dam would be constructed.

In July 1956, construction on the dam began. Problems quickly arose while transporting material to the construction site as only one small railway existed through the narrow gorge. Kansai decided to construct the  Kanden Tunnel under Mount Akazawa that could bring supplies from Ōmachi eastward towards the construction site. The tunnel's construction proved an arduous task as a large fracture zone in the rock was encountered which took seven months to repair. In September 1959, the first concrete for the dam was placed and by October next year, the reservoir had begun to fill.

The Kurobe No. 4 power station was built completely underground to protect it from common avalanches in the gorge and also for nature conservation purposes. By January 1961, two of Kurobe No. 4's Pelton turbines had begun operation at an initial capacity of 154 MW. In August 1962, the third turbine was in operation and by June 1963, the dam was complete at a final cost of ¥ 51.3 billion ($142.5 million (1963)). In 1973, a fourth turbine was installed and became operational; bringing the power station's production capacity to 335 MW. The fourth turbine cost ¥ 1.4 billion yen ($5 million (1973)). The first two turbines were manufactured by Voith and the second two by Japan's Hitachi. The dam initiated the development of Japan's first 275kV transmission system as well which allowed the transfer of electricity over greater distances. A total of 171 people died during the construction of the dam.

Specifications

Three other openings exist in the dam's orifice which consist of  diameter pipes, two of which can discharge a maximum of  each and the third .

The dam's power station, Kurobe No. 4, is located underground and contains four generators which are powered by Pelton turbines for a total installed capacity of 335 MW and average annual generation of 1 billion kWh.

Access
The Kurobe Dam is the most popular hydropower site in Japan and, between late June and mid-October, water is released from its spillway for onlookers. The surrounding Kurobe Gorge is popular as well and is accessible by the Tateyama Kurobe Alpine Route.

Start from Toyama Station which, from March 2015, is accessible by Hokuriku Shinkansen (trains Kagayaki or its slightly slower counterpart, Hakutaka) from Tokyo, Nagano, Kanazawa, and various other stations along the Hokuriku Shinkansen Line. Take the train from Dentetsu Toyama Station in Toyama to Tateyama Station (Toyama) by Toyama Chihō Railway Tateyama Line (65 minutes). (Note: Toyama Station is the main station with the shinkansen hub, while Dentetsu Toyama is the station next to the main station with local lines that go through the towns of Funahashi, Kamiichi, and Tateyama, to ultimately reach Tateyama Station (Toyama)). From Tateyama Station (Toyama), take the Tateyama Cable Car to Bijodaira Station (7 minutes). From there, the Tateyama Kurobe Alpine Route bus will take you to the 2450 m high Murodō Station (50 minutes).

From Murodō Station, visitors should take the Tateyama Tunnel Trolleybus (10 minutes), followed by the Tateyama Ropeway (7 minutes), and finally the Kurobe Cable Car (5 minutes). From the last stop, a 15-minute walk will take visitors to the dam. The whole trip from Toyama Station takes roughly four hours to complete one-way, and costs around 10,000 yen in transportation fees. Various accommodations are available in Murodo area as well as near Tateyama Station, for those too tired to make the trip back down into Toyama City.

In popular culture 
The novel The Sun of Kurobe (黒部の太陽; Kurobe no Taiyō) dramatizes the construction of the dam. It was adapted into the 1968 film The Sands of Kurobe. 

The television series Project X: Chôsensha tachi (2000-2005) was also based on the dam's construction. 

The final arc of the 2004 Tetsujin 28-go anime, which takes place in a fictionalized 1950s Japan, heavily involves the construction of the Kurobe Dam.

The 1961 kaiju film Mothra includes an action sequence filmed at the dam before its completion. Mothra's attack causes the dam to break.

Kurobe dam can be seen in the 1964 film Ghidorah, the Three-Headed Monster.

Kurobe Dam features prominently in the opening scene of the 1966 film Gamera vs. Barugon, in which Gamera attacks the facility’s hydroelectric plant to obtain energy in the form of fire. The dam itself then bursts after Gamera collides with it twice while flying away.

The 2000 action thriller Whiteout was shot in and around Kurobe Dam, renamed Okutowa Dam in the film.

The mecha anime television series Kuromukuro (2016)  is mainly set in a UN research facility located around the lake.

See also 

 Kurobe Gorge Railway
 Kurobe Senyō Railway
 List of power stations in Japan

References

External links 

 Tateyama Kurobe Alpine Route official website

1963 establishments in Japan
Arch dams
Dams completed in 1963
Dams in Toyama Prefecture
Energy infrastructure completed in 1973
Hida Mountains
Hydroelectric power stations in Japan
Tateyama Kurobe Alpine Route
Kurobe, Toyama